"Burn the Witch" is the third single released from Queens of the Stone Age's fourth album, Lullabies to Paralyze. Many of its lyrics run parallel with the dark, folkloristic theme for this album.

Along with "You've Got a Killer Scene There, Man...", it borrows heavily from the blues. ZZ Top's guitarist and singer Billy Gibbons appears on lead guitar and backup vocals. Gibbons also plays on a cover of his own band's "Precious and Grace", a bonus track on the album.

The song involves an exchange of vocal lines between the falsetto of Homme and the twin baritones of Gibbons and Mark Lanegan. Gibbons does not regularly tour with the band, so the other vocal was performed by Lanegan, until he stopped touring with the band. Currently, Josh Homme sings alone with backing vocals from the rest of the band. In the previous line-up, Homme played bass and Alain Johannes played a quite different version of Gibbons' solo. This song (its remix by UNKLE) was also featured in and on the soundtrack of Saw II. This song is also featured in the trailer to the fourth season of the HBO series True Blood. Also featured in Peaky Blinders.

Track listing

"Burn the Witch" (Castillo, Homme, Van Leeuwen) - 3:38
"No One Knows" [live] (Homme, Lanegan) - 7:49
"I Wanna Make It wit Chu" [live] (Homme, Johannes, Melchiondo) - 4:29
"Monsters in the Parasol" [live] (Homme, Lalli) - 4:34
"Burn the Witch" [multimedia track] (Castillo, Homme, Van Leeuwen) - 5:38

All the live tracks are taken from Over the Years and Through the Woods DVD/CD.

Charts

Personnel
 Joe Barresi – producer, engineer, mixing
 Josh Homme – producer, vocals, bass guitar, guitar licks
 Troy Van Leeuwen – lap steel guitar
 Joey Castillo – drums
 Alain Johannes – guitar, engineer
 Mark Lanegan – vocals
 Billy Gibbons – lead guitar, vocals
 Jack Black – marching
 Liam Lynch – video producer, video director

Music video

The music video features Josh Homme, Brody Dalle, Troy Van Leeuwen, Joey Castillo, Chris Goss, Wendy Rae Fowler, Jesse Hughes, Alain Johannes, Natasha Shneider, Billy Gibbons and Serrina Sims.

References

External links

Queens of the Stone Age songs
2006 singles
Blues rock songs
Songs written by Josh Homme
Songs written by Joey Castillo
Songs written by Troy Van Leeuwen
2005 songs
Universal Music Group singles
Songs about witches